Para Toda La Vida may refer to:

Music
Albums
 Para Toda La Vida (Rocío Dúrcal album), a 1999 studio album released by Spanish performer Rocío Dúrcal
 Para Toda La Vida (Los Mismos album), a 2008 album by Los Mismos
 Para Toda La Vida, 2011 album by K-Paz de la Sierra
Songs
 "Para Toda La Vida" (song), a 2007 song by El Sueño De Morfeo
 "Para Toda La Vida" by Rocío Dúrcal Composed by Roberto Livi
 "Para Toda la Vida" by Flaco Jiménez
 "Para Toda la Vida" by Juan Gabriel